Philip Wilfred Robertson was a New Zealand chemist, university professor, and writer.

Philip Robertson, son of Donald Robertson was born on 22 September 1884 and educated at Wellington College, where he was dux in 1900. He then graduated with an MA in chemistry from Victoria University of Wellington in 1905, followed by an MSc in 1906.  He was awarded a Sir George Grey Scholarship, a Senior Scholarship and the Jacob Joseph Scholarship. He gained first-class honours in natural sciences at Trinity College, Oxford as a Rhodes Scholar, followed by a PhD at Leipzig University.

Robertson married Florence Elizabeth Graham in 1912. He took up the chair of chemistry at Victoria University College in 1920 where he headed the department for 30 years.

Robertson had an interest in literature and wrote several short stories.

In his retirement Robertson was appointed professor emeritus. He was awarded the Hector Memorial Medal in 1919 and in 1950 was elected to a fellowship of the Royal Society of New Zealand. Robertson died in London on 7 May 1969.

References
 Davis, Brian R. 'Robertson, Philip Wilfred 1884–1969  Dictionary of New Zealand Biography, updated 22 June 2007

1884 births
1969 deaths
People educated at Wellington College (New Zealand)
New Zealand chemists
New Zealand Rhodes Scholars
Victoria University of Wellington alumni
Academic staff of the Victoria University of Wellington
Fellows of the Royal Society of New Zealand
Alumni of Trinity College, Oxford
Leipzig University alumni
20th-century New Zealand scientists